Ro-41 may refer to:

IMAM Ro.41, an Italian biplane fighter and trainer aircraft of the 1930s and 1940s
, an Imperial Japanese Navy submarine commissioned in November 1943 and sunk in March 1945